Parviz Khanlu (also Romanized as Parvīz Khānlū) is a village in Garamduz Rural District, Garamduz District, Khoda Afarin County, East Azerbaijan Province, Iran. At the 2006 census, its population was 258, in 57 families.

References 

Populated places in Khoda Afarin County